The Silver Meteor is a passenger train operated by Amtrak between New York City and Miami, Florida. Introduced in 1939 as the first diesel-powered streamliner between New York and Florida, it was the flagship train of the Seaboard Air Line Railroad (SAL) and one of its flagship trains of its successor, the Seaboard Coast Line Railroad (SCL). The train was transferred to Amtrak when it took over intercity passenger rail service in 1971. 

The train is part of Amtrak's Silver Service brand, along with its sister train, the Silver Star, SAL’s other former flagship streamliner. The two trains are the remnants of the numerous long-distance trains that operated between New York and Florida for most of the 20th century.

During fiscal year 2019, the Silver Meteor carried 353,466 passengers, an increase of 4.9% from FY2018.  In FY2016, the train had a total revenue of $36,652,426, a decrease of 4.7% from FY2015.

History

The Silver Meteor was inaugurated by the SAL on February 2, 1939. The name was selected via contest, with 30 people among 76,000 entrants proposing the winning name. Utilizing EMC E4 diesel locomotives originally purchased for SAL's flagship all-Pullman train, the Orange Blossom Special, it became the first diesel-powered streamliner to Florida. Its introduction later prompted SAL's competitor, the Atlantic Coast Line Railroad (ACL), to introduce its own New York-Florida streamliner, the Champion, on December 1, 1939. The SAL emphasized the train's modernity, referring to it as the "Train of Tomorrow" and having its first trip to Florida begin not from New York Penn Station, but from the Long Island Rail Road station at the 1939 New York World's Fair. The original schedule took 25 hours.

The train used seven new cars manufactured by the Budd Company, those being a baggage-dormitory-coach, a diner straddled by two coaches on either side, and a coach-lounge-observation. The train was originally tri-weekly, alternating service between Miami and St. Petersburg every other day. However, the train proved to be so popular that after new equipment was delivered, SAL upgraded the train to daily operation to both coasts in December 1939. Heavyweight sleeping cars would be added to the train in 1941, and would be upgraded to lightweight sleeping cars in 1947. In 1956, SAL introduced the Sun Lounge to the train. These cars included five double-bedrooms on one end, and a lounge with glass panels in the roof. This was due to the fact that full dome cars could not fit through the tunnels on the Northeast Corridor between New York and Washington D.C.

The Pennsylvania Railroad carried the train from New York to Washington along its mainline—now the Northeast Corridor—under a haulage agreement. Between Washington and Richmond, Virginia it used the Richmond, Fredericksburg and Potomac Railroad, jointly owned by the SAL and five other railroads. South of Richmond, the train used SAL's own mainline via Raleigh, North Carolina, Columbia, South Carolina, Savannah, Georgia, Jacksonville, Florida and Ocala, Florida. At Wildwood, Florida, the train was split into east and west coast sections. The east coast section continued to Miami, and the west coast section to Tampa, where the train would be split again to go to St. Petersburg and Sarasota-Venice.

The Seaboard Air Line Railroad merged with the Atlantic Coast Line Railroad to form the Seaboard Coast Line Railroad in 1967, and in 1968 the new railroad reshuffled the Florida streamliners. The Silver Meteor lost its west coast section and began serving Miami only. The Pennsylvania Railroad merged with the New York Central Railroad to form Penn Central Transportation in 1968, which inherited the longstanding haulage agreement for the Silver Meteor. Amtrak retained the train when it took over most intercity passenger trains on May 1, 1971.

Amtrak era

From December 17, 1971, to April 15, 1972, and September 10, 1972, to April 27, 1973, the Silver Meteor bypassed Jacksonville, running over the Gross Cutoff between Gross near the Georgia state line and Baldwin. Between November 14, 1971 and January 16, 1972, the Silver Meteor made the major shift in its route, shifting from its traditional path on the old SAL mainline via Raleigh and Columbia to the old ACL mainline through Florence and Charleston, South Carolina. Between June 11 and September 10, 1972 the Silver Meteor was extended to Boston and called the Meteor. Service to St. Petersburg returned with the train splitting at Auburndale, FL.

On several occasions during the 1970s, the Silver Meteor was combined with the Champion, the main rival of the Silver Meteor up until the SCL merger. In the summer of 1972, Amtrak split the trains in Savannah, with the Champion continuing to St. Petersburg and the Meteor continuing to Miami. They were combined again for the summers of 1975, 1976 and 1977, splitting in Jacksonville. Finally, in 1979, the Champion was permanently consolidated into the Silver Meteor as its St. Petersburg section. Although the Champion name was preserved for a time, it disappeared with the October 1, 1979 timetable.

On September 30, 1979 the Silver Meteor was rerouted between Savannah and Jacksonville over the former Atlantic Coast Line Railroad route, due to the abandonment of the old SAL route. On January 31, 1984 the Silver Meteor's Florida west coast terminus was cut back from St. Petersburg to Tampa, ending almost 100 years of rail passenger service to St. Petersburg. By October 26, 1986 the Silver Meteor had shifted to the old ACL route north of Savannah, as the abandonment of the SAL route north of Raleigh affected only the Silver Star. On June 11, 1988 the tracks between Coleman and Auburndale, Florida were abandoned, then removed to create the General James A. Van Fleet State Trail, shifting the Miami section west to Lakeland.

By the end of 1988, the Silver Meteor's Miami section had train numbers 97 and 98, while the Tampa section had train numbers 87 and 88. The Tampa section (87 and 88) was discontinued in 1994, and the Miami section (97 and 98) was rerouted through Orlando, and are still used today.

The best timing for Amtrak's Silver Meteor between Miami and New York City was 27 hours in 2008; SAL's first edition took 25 hours in 1939.  Late trains often add more hours to today's schedules, most often caused by freight delays.

In the January 2011 issue of Trains Magazine this route was listed as one of five routes to be looked at by Amtrak in FY 2011 as the previous five routes (Sunset, Eagle, Zephyr, Capitol, and Cardinal) were examined in FY 2010.

In October 2019, the Silver Meteor's dining car discontinued serving freshly cooked meals in a traditional, restaurant-style setting, otherwise known as "traditional dining." Amtrak introduced the “flexible dining” system to the Silver Meteor, which consists of pre-prepared meals which are then heated in either a convection oven or a microwave oven at the time of purchase. In a Rail Passengers Association webinar that took place on November 16, 2022, Amtrak's vice president of long-distance service revealed that traditional dining service is planned to be reintroduced on the Silver Meteor and the Silver Star in early 2023.

In 2021, Amtrak reached out to FDOT to begin negotiations again for utilization of the Miami Intermodal Center (MIC), the replacement for Amtrak's current Miami station. This comes after years of disagreement over the platform length at the MIC, as Amtrak normally adds cars to the Silver Meteor and Silver Star during the winter season to accommodate increased demand. In February 2022, negotiations restarted between FDOT and Amtrak. Later in March 2022, a test train operated into and out of the station and proved that the platforms are sufficient in length to hold a standard 10 car train. However, the platforms are not long enough to accommodate an 11 to 12 car train, which could be possible in the winter months. In September 2022, Amtrak management announced that it had restarted lease negotiations with FDOT regarding use and maintenance of the terminal. One issue however, is the deadheading move that will need to take place between the MIC and Hialeah. Amtrak CEO Stephen Gardner has stated that "the company is evaluating technical and operational aspects of the move." In an Amtrak Public Board Meeting Q&A on December 1, 2022, it was revealed that Amtrak is in the final stages of its preparations for relocating from their current Miami station, and plans to officially relocate to the MIC in 2023.

COVID-19 pandemic
On July 6, 2020, Amtrak reduced the frequency of this train to four times per week as opposed to daily due to the impact of ridership from the worldwide COVID-19 Coronavirus pandemic.  Southbound Silver Meteor trains departed New York Monday through Thursday, while Silver Star trains departed Friday through Sunday.  Similarly, northbound Silver Meteor trains departed Miami Sunday through Wednesday, while Silver Star trains departed Miami on Thursday through Saturday. Both trains resumed daily services on June 7, 2021, after additional Amtrak funding was included in the American Rescue Plan Act of 2021. 

From January 24 to October 14, 2022, the Silver Meteor was suspended due to the Omicron variant surge of the coronavirus pandemic and its effect on staffing and equipment availability. During this period, the Silver Meteor's sister train, the Silver Star, continued to operate. Additional coach and sleeping car capacity was added to the Silver Star, creating a train that carried as many as six coaches and five sleepers. The Silver Star provided once-daily service to stations normally served by both trains between New York and Rocky Mount, NC as well as between Savannah and Miami during this period. Furthermore, a stop was temporarily added at Jesup, Georgia, which is usually only served by the Silver Meteor. Once-daily service remained available to Silver Meteor stations between Rocky Mount, North Carolina and Savannah via the daily daytime Palmetto, which operates between New York and Savannah. The Silver Meteor's resumption date was pushed back a total of six times. Originally scheduled to return on March 27, it was pushed back to May 23, then September 11, and finally October 3. However, Hurricane Ian caused extensive damage to the Central Florida Rail Corridor in late September, which Amtrak uses to get to central and southern Florida. Amtrak in response pushed the suspension back to October 6, then to October 11, and finally October 14 after the full extent of the damage became apparent.

Ridership

Equipment

The original Silver Meteor used lightweight cars built by the Budd Company. Three consists were needed for a daily train between New York and Miami; each had a baggage-dormitory-coach (22 seats), three 60-seat coaches, a tavern-lounge-coach (30 seats), a dining car, and a coach-observation-lounge (48 seats). Some of the coaches were owned by the Pennsylvania Railroad. Budd delivered more cars in November–December 1940, allowing daily service to St. Petersburg: three baggage-dormitory-coaches (18 seats), seven 56-seat coaches, two dining cars, and three coach-buffet-observation cars (30 seats).

By the early 1960s, the SAL's Silver Meteor typically had 17 cars or more, consisting of nine Pullman sleeping cars including its highly touted glass-topped Sun Lounge introduced in 1956, several coaches, two dining cars, and an observation car with tavern.

The Silver Meteor now uses Amtrak's standard long-distance single-level equipment: Viewliner baggage cars, Viewliner sleeping cars, Viewliner dining cars, Amfleet café-lounges and Amfleet coaches. An ACS-64 electric locomotive is used between New York City and Washington, D.C, while two GE P42DC diesel electric locomotives are used for power south of Washington, D.C.

A typical Silver Meteor consist as of January 2023 is made up of:

 1 ACS-64 locomotive (New York–Washington)
 2 P42DC locomotive (Washington–Miami)
 3 Amfleet II Coaches
 1 Amfleet II Café/Lounge
 1 Viewliner II Diner
 3 Viewliner I/II Sleepers (Viewliner II-Viewliner I-Viewliner II)
 1 Viewliner II Baggage Car

Route details

The Silver Meteor operates over a combination of Amtrak and CSX Transportation trackage:
 New York – Washington D.C. (Amtrak)
 Northeast Corridor: 
 Washington D.C. – DeLand, Florida (CSXT)
 RF&P Subdivision
 Richmond Terminal Subdivision
 North End Subdivision
 South End Subdivision
 Charleston Subdivision
 Savannah Subdivision
 Nahunta Subdivision
 Jacksonville Terminal Subdivision
 Sanford Subdivision 
 DeLand - Poinciana, Florida (SunRail)
 Central Florida Rail Corridor
 Poinciana - Mangonia Park, Florida (CSXT)
 Carters Subdivision
 Auburndale Subdivision
 Miami Subdivision
 Mangonia Park - Miami, Florida (Tri-Rail)
 South Florida Rail Corridor

The Silver Meteor uses the same route as the Silver Starthe other train in the Silver Service brandexcluding two segments: Selma, North Carolina – Savannah, Georgia, and Kissimmee, Florida – Winter Haven, Florida. Between Selma and Savannah, the Silver Star travels inland over the CSX S-Line to serve the Carolinas' state capitals of Raleigh and Columbia, while the Silver Meteor travels closer to the coast on the CSX A-Line and serves Fayetteville, North Carolina and Charleston, South Carolina. Between Kissimmee and Winter Haven, the Silver Meteor turns south to go directly to Miami at Auburndale, Florida, while the Silver Star continues west to Lakeland, Florida and Tampa, before coming back to Auburndale and turning south to Miami. In addition to these diversions, between Sebring, Florida and West Palm Beach, Florida, the Silver Meteor makes no intermediate stops, while the Silver Star makes an additional stop at Okeechobee, Florida. Inversely, between Savannah and Jacksonville, Florida, the Silver Meteor makes an additional stop at Jesup, Georgia, while the Silver Star makes no intermediate stops. The daytime Palmetto operates from New York to Savannah over the same route as the Silver Meteor, allowing cities in the Carolinas and Virginia on the Silver Meteor's route to have service during the day.

In its present form, the southbound Silver Meteor leaves New York in mid-afternoon, arriving in Washington at dinner time and traveling overnight through Virginia and the Carolinas for arrival at breakfast time the following morning in Savannah, rush hour in Jacksonville, lunchtime in Orlando, and early evening in Miami. Northbound trains leave Miami just before rush hour, arriving in central Florida at lunchtime and Jacksonville in late afternoon and dinner time in Savannah, then passing through the Carolinas and Virginia overnight for arrival at breakfast time in Washington, mid-morning in Philadelphia and lunchtime in New York.

Like other long-distance trains operating on the Northeast Corridor, local travel between NEC stations is not allowed on the Silver Meteor. Northbound trains only stop to discharge passengers from Alexandria, Virginia northward, and southbound trains only stop to receive passengers from Newark, New Jersey to Washington. This policy is in place to keep seats available for passengers making longer trips. Passengers wanting to travel locally must use the more frequent Northeast Regional or Acela trains. Additionally, the Silver Meteor, like the Silver Star, does not allow local travel between West Palm Beach and Miami. Southbound trains only stop to discharge passengers, while northbound trains only stop to receive passengers bound for points beyond West Palm Beach. This is due to the availability of Tri-Rail, South Florida's commuter rail system.

Station stops

See also
Champion

References

Mike Schafer, Amtrak's atlas, Trains June 1991
PRR Chronology
Amtrak's First Trains and Routes
Amtrak timetable, November 14, 1971
Amtrak timetable, late 1988 (Northeast Corridor only)

Notes

External links

Amtrak routes
Passenger trains of the Seaboard Air Line Railroad
Passenger trains of the Seaboard Coast Line Railroad
Railway services introduced in 1939
Passenger rail transportation in New York (state)
Passenger rail transportation in New Jersey
Passenger rail transportation in Pennsylvania
Passenger rail transportation in Delaware
Passenger rail transportation in Maryland
Passenger rail transportation in Washington, D.C.
Passenger rail transportation in Virginia
Passenger rail transportation in North Carolina
Passenger rail transportation in South Carolina
Passenger rail transportation in Georgia (U.S. state)
Passenger rail transportation in Florida
Night trains of the United States
Long distance Amtrak routes